is a Japanese professional baseball pitcher for the Chunichi Dragons of Nippon Professional Baseball (NPB).

Career

On November 26, 2020, Takeuchi re-signed with Dragons.

References

External links
Dragons.jp
NPB.jp

2001 births
Living people
Baseball people from Hokkaido
Chunichi Dragons players
Japanese baseball players
Nippon Professional Baseball pitchers
People from Sapporo